Gymnanthera oblonga is a species of vine in the family Apocynaceae (previously Asclepiadaceae) from northern Australia, southeast Asia (Cambodia, Indonesia, Malaysia, Philippines, Thailand, Vietnam), New Guinea, and southern China (Guangdong, Hainan).

References

Periplocoideae
Flora of Asia
Flora of Australia
Plants described in 1768
Taxa named by Nicolaas Laurens Burman